Yoko Minamoto (源洋子, Minamoto Yoko, born 18 July 1967) is a Japanese sport shooter who competed in the 1988 Summer Olympics, in the 1992 Summer Olympics, and in the 1996 Summer Olympics.

References

1967 births
Living people
Japanese female sport shooters
ISSF rifle shooters
Olympic shooters of Japan
Shooters at the 1988 Summer Olympics
Shooters at the 1992 Summer Olympics
Shooters at the 1996 Summer Olympics
Shooters at the 1990 Asian Games
Shooters at the 1994 Asian Games
Shooters at the 1998 Asian Games
Shooters at the 2006 Asian Games
Asian Games medalists in shooting
Asian Games gold medalists for Japan
Asian Games silver medalists for Japan
Asian Games bronze medalists for Japan
Medalists at the 1990 Asian Games
Medalists at the 1994 Asian Games
Medalists at the 1998 Asian Games
20th-century Japanese women
21st-century Japanese women